Matteo Levantesi (born 18 April 1997) is an Italian artistic gymnast who won silver medal with the team at the 2022 European Men's Artistic Gymnastics Championships.

References

External links
 

1997 births
Living people
Italian male artistic gymnasts